General elections were held in Japan on 1 March 1903. The Rikken Seiyūkai party remained the largest in the House of Representatives, winning 175 of the 376 seats, but lost its majority.

Electoral system
The 376 members of the House of Representatives were elected in 51 multi-member constituencies based on prefectures and cities. Voting was restricted to men aged over 25 who paid at least 10 yen a year in direct taxation.

Campaign
A total of 537 candidates contested the 376 seats.

Results

References

General elections in Japan
Japan
1903 elections in Japan
March 1903 events
Election and referendum articles with incomplete results